September 2013

See also

References

 09
September 2013 events in the United States